The 1990 Big Ten Conference baseball tournament was held at Duane Banks Field on the campus of the University of Iowa in Iowa City, Iowa from May 15 through 19. The top two teams from the regular season in each division participated in the double-elimination tournament, the tenth annual tournament sponsored by the Big Ten Conference to determine the league champion.  won their second tournament championship and earned the Big Ten Conference's automatic bid to the 1990 NCAA Division I baseball tournament

Format and seeding 
The 1990 tournament was a 4-team double-elimination tournament, with seeds determined by conference regular season winning percentage only. Iowa claimed the second seed by tiebreaker over Illinois

Tournament

All-Tournament Team 
The following players were named to the All-Tournament Team.

Most Outstanding Player 
Bob Christensen was named Most Outstanding Player. Christensen was a shortstop for Illinois.

References 

Tournament
Big Ten baseball tournament
Big Ten Baseball Tournament
Big Ten baseball tournament